The imperial system of units, imperial system or imperial units (also known as British Imperial or Exchequer Standards of 1826) is the system of units first defined in the British Weights and Measures Act 1824 and continued to be developed through a series of Weights and Measures Acts and amendments.

The imperial system developed from earlier English units as did the related but differing system of customary units of the United States. The imperial units replaced the Winchester Standards, which were in effect from 1588 to 1825. The system came into official use across the British Empire in 1826.

By the late 20th century, most nations of the former empire had officially adopted the metric system as their main system of measurement, but imperial units are still used alongside metric units in the United Kingdom and in some other parts of the former empire, notably Canada.

The modern UK legislation defining the imperial system of units is given in the Weights and Measures Act 1985 (as amended).

Implementation
The Weights and Measures Act of 1824 was initially scheduled to go into effect on 1 May 1825. The Weights and Measures Act of 1825 pushed back the date to 1 January 1826. The 1824 Act allowed the continued use of pre-imperial units provided that they were customary, widely known, and clearly marked with imperial equivalents.

Apothecaries' units

Apothecaries' units are not mentioned in the acts of 1824 and 1825. At the time, apothecaries' weights and measures were regulated "in England, Wales, and Berwick-upon-Tweed" by the London College of Physicians, and in Ireland by the Dublin College of Physicians. In Scotland, apothecaries' units were unofficially regulated by the Edinburgh College of Physicians. The three colleges published, at infrequent intervals, pharmacopoeias, the London and Dublin editions having the force of law.

Imperial apothecaries' measures, based on the imperial pint of 20 fluid ounces, were introduced by the publication of the London Pharmacopoeia of 1836, the Edinburgh Pharmacopoeia of 1839, and the Dublin Pharmacopoeia of 1850. The Medical Act of 1858 transferred to The Crown the right to publish the official pharmacopoeia and to regulate apothecaries' weights and measures.

Units

Length
Metric equivalents in this article usually assume the latest official definition. Before this date, the most precise measurement of the imperial Standard Yard was  metres.

Area

Volume 
The Weights and Measures Act 1824 invalidated the various different gallons in use in the British Empire, declaring them to be replaced by the statute gallon (which became known as the imperial gallon), a unit close in volume to the ale gallon. The Weights and Measures Act 1985 defined a gallon to be exactly  (approximately ).

British apothecaries' volume measures
These measurements were in use from 1826, when the new imperial gallon was defined. For pharmaceutical purposes, they were replaced by the metric system in the United Kingdom on 1 January 1971. In the US, though no longer recommended, the apothecaries' system is still used occasionally in medicine, especially in prescriptions for older medications.

Mass and weight 
In the 19th and 20th centuries, the UK used three different systems for mass and weight.

 troy weight, used for precious metals;
 avoirdupois weight, used for most other purposes; and
 apothecaries' weight, now virtually unused since the metric system is used for all scientific purposes.

The distinction between mass and weight is not always clearly drawn. Strictly a pound is a unit of mass, but it is commonly referred to as a weight. When a distinction is necessary, the term pound-force may refer to a unit of force rather than mass. The troy pound was made the primary unit of mass by the 1824 Act and its use was abolished in the UK on 1 January 1879, with only the troy ounce and its decimal subdivisions retained. The Weights and Measures Act 1855 (18 & 19 Victoria C72) made the avoirdupois pound the primary unit of mass. In all the systems, the fundamental unit is the pound, and all other units are defined as fractions or multiples of it.

|}

Natural equivalents 
The 1824 Act of Parliament defined the yard and pound by reference to the prototype standards, and it also defined the values of certain physical constants, to make provision for re-creation of the standards if they were to be damaged. For the yard, the length of a pendulum beating seconds at the latitude of Greenwich at Mean Sea Level in vacuo was defined as  inches. For the pound, the mass of a cubic inch of distilled water at an atmospheric pressure of 30 inches of mercury and a temperature of 62° Fahrenheit was defined as 252.458 grains, with there being 7,000 grains per pound.

Following the destruction of the original prototypes in the 1834 Houses of Parliament fire, it proved impossible to recreate the standards from these definitions, and a new Weights and Measures Act (18 & 19 Victoria. Cap. 72) was passed in 1855 which permitted the recreation of the prototypes from recognized secondary standards.

Current use 
=== United Kingdom ===

Since the Weights and Measures Act 1985, British law defines base imperial units in terms of their metric equivalent. The metric system is routinely used in business and technology within the United Kingdom, with imperial units remaining in widespread use amongst the public. All UK roads use the imperial system except for weight limits, and newer height or width restriction signs give metric alongside imperial.
Traders in the UK may accept requests from customers specified in imperial units, and scales which display in both unit systems are commonplace in the retail trade. Metric price signs may be accompanied by imperial price signs provided that the imperial signs are no larger and no more prominent than the metric ones.

The United Kingdom completed its official partial transition to the metric system in 1995, with imperial units still legally mandated for certain applications such as draught beer and cider, and road-signs. Therefore, the speedometers on vehicles sold in the UK must be capable of displaying miles per hour. Even though the troy pound was outlawed in the UK in the Weights and Measures Act of 1878, the troy ounce may still be used for the weights of precious stones and metals. The original railways (many built in the Victorian era) are a big user of imperial units, with distances officially measured in miles and yards or miles and chains, and also feet and inches, and speeds are in miles per hour.

Some British people still use one or more imperial units in everyday life for distance (miles, yards, feet, and inches) and some types of volume measurement (especially milk and beer in pints; rarely for canned or bottled soft drinks, or petrol). , many British people also still use imperial units in everyday life for body weight (stones and pounds for adults, pounds and ounces for babies). Government documents aimed at the public may give body weight and height in imperial units as well as in metric. A survey in 2015 found that many people did not know their body weight or height in both systems. People under the age of 40 preferred the metric system but people aged 40 and over preferred the imperial system. Fuel consumption for vehicles is commonly stated in miles per gallon (mpg), though official figures always include litres per  equivalents and fuel is sold in litres. When sold draught in licensed premises, beer and cider must be sold in pints, half-pints or third-pints. Cow's milk is available in both litre- and pint-based containers in supermarkets and shops. Areas of land associated with farming, forestry and real estate are commonly advertised in acres and square feet but, for contracts and land registration purposes, the units are always hectares and square metres.

Office space and industrial units are usually advertised in square feet. Steel pipe sizes are sold in increments of inches, while copper pipe is sold in increments of millimetres. Road bicycles have their frames measured in centimetres, while off-road bicycles have their frames measured in inches. Display sizes for screens on television sets and computer monitors are always diagonally measured in inches. Food sold by length or width, e.g. pizzas or sandwiches, is generally sold in inches. Clothing is usually sized in inches, with the metric equivalent often shown as a small supplementary indicator. Gas is usually measured by the cubic foot or cubic metre, but is billed like electricity by the kilowatt hour.

Pre-packaged products can show both metric and imperial measures, and it is also common to see imperial pack sizes with metric only labels, e.g. a  tin of Lyle's Golden Syrup is always labelled  with no imperial indicator. Similarly most jars of jam and packs of sausages are labelled  with no imperial indicator.

India

India began converting to the metric system from the imperial system between 1955 and 1962. The metric system in weights and measures was adopted by the Indian Parliament in December 1956 with the Standards of Weights and Measures Act, which took effect beginning 1 October 1958. By 1962, metric units became "mandatory and exclusive."

Today all official measurements are made in the metric system. In common usage some older Indians may still refer to imperial units. Some measurements, such as the heights of mountains, are still recorded in feet. Tyre rim diameters are still measured in inches, as used worldwide. Industries like the construction and the real estate industry still use both the metric and the imperial system though it is more common for sizes of homes to be given in square feet and land in acres.

In Standard Indian English, as in Australian, Singaporean, and British English, metric units such as the litre, metre, and tonne utilise the traditional spellings brought over from French, which differ from those used in the United States and the Philippines. The imperial long ton is invariably spelt with one 'n'.

Hong Kong

Hong Kong has three main systems of units of measurement in current use:

 The Chinese units of measurement of the Qing Empire (no longer in widespread use in China);
 British imperial units; and
 The metric system.

In 1976 the Hong Kong Government started the conversion to the metric system, and as of 2012 measurements for government purposes, such as road signs, are almost always in metric units. All three systems are officially permitted for trade, and in the wider society a mixture of all three systems prevails.

These units are now rarely used in daily life, the imperial and metric systems being preferred. The imperial equivalents are written with the same basic Chinese characters as the Chinese system. In order to distinguish between the units of the two systems, the units can be prefixed with "Ying" (jing1) for the imperial system and "Wa" (waa4) for the Chinese system. In writing, derived characters are often used, with an additional  (mouth) radical to the left of the original Chinese character, for writing imperial units. The most commonly used units are the mile or "li" (li1), the yard or "ma" (maa5), the foot or "chek" (cek3), and the inch or "tsun" (cyun3).

The traditional measure of flat area is the square foot (fong1 cek3, ping4 fong1 cek3) of the imperial system, which is still in common use for real estate purposes.

For the measurement of volume, Hong Kong officially uses the metric system, though the gallon (gaa1 leon4-2) is also occasionally used.

Canada 

During the 1970s, the metric system and SI units were introduced in Canada to replace the imperial system. Within the government, efforts to implement the metric system were extensive; almost any agency, institution, or function provided by the government uses SI units exclusively. Imperial units were eliminated from all public road signs and both systems of measurement will still be found on privately owned signs, such as the height warnings at the entrance of a parkade. In the 1980s, momentum to fully convert to the metric system stalled when the government of Brian Mulroney was elected. There was heavy opposition to metrication and as a compromise the government maintains legal definitions for and allows use of imperial units as long as metric units are shown as well.
The law requires that measured products (such as fuel and meat) be priced in metric units and an imperial price can be shown if a metric price is present. There tends to be leniency in regards to fruits and vegetables being priced in imperial units only.
Environment Canada still offers an imperial unit option beside metric units, even though weather is typically measured and reported in metric units in the Canadian media. Some radio stations near the United States border (such as CIMX and CIDR) primarily use imperial units to report the weather. Railways in Canada also continue to use imperial units.

Imperial units are still used in ordinary conversation. Today, Canadians typically use a mix of metric and imperial measurements in their daily lives. The use of the metric and imperial systems varies by age. The older generation mostly uses the imperial system, while the younger generation more often uses the metric system. Quebec has implemented metrication more fully.  Newborns are measured in SI at hospitals, but the birth weight and length is also announced to family and friends in imperial units. Drivers' licences use SI units, though many English-speaking Canadians give their height and weight in imperial. In livestock auction markets, cattle are sold in dollars per hundredweight (short), whereas hogs are sold in dollars per hundred kilograms. Imperial units still dominate in recipes, construction, house renovation and gardening. Land is now surveyed and registered in metric units whilst initial surveys used imperial units. For example, partitioning of farm land on the prairies in the late 19th and early 20th centuries was done in imperial units; this accounts for imperial units of distance and area retaining wide use in the Prairie Provinces. In English-speaking Canada commercial and residential spaces are mostly (but not exclusively) constructed using square feet, while in French-speaking Quebec commercial and residential spaces are constructed in metres and advertised using both square metres and square feet as equivalents. Carpet or flooring tile is purchased by the square foot, but less frequently also in square metres. Motor-vehicle fuel consumption is reported in both litres per  and statute miles per imperial gallon, leading to the erroneous impression that Canadian vehicles are 20% more fuel-efficient than their apparently identical American counterparts for which fuel economy is reported in statute miles per US gallon (neither country specifies which gallon is used). Canadian railways maintain exclusive use of imperial measurements to describe train length (feet), train height (feet), capacity (tons), speed (mph), and trackage (miles).

Imperial units also retain common use in firearms and ammunition. Imperial measures are still used in the description of cartridge types, even when the cartridge is of relatively recent invention (e.g., .204 Ruger, .17 HMR, where the calibre is expressed in decimal fractions of an inch). Ammunition that is already classified in metric is still kept metric (e.g., 9×19mm). In the manufacture of ammunition, bullet and powder weights are expressed in terms of grains for both metric and imperial cartridges.

As in most of the western world, air navigation is based on nautical units, e.g., the nautical mile, which is neither imperial nor metric, though altitude is still measured in imperial feet in keeping with the international standard.

Australia

While Metrication in Australia has largely ended the official use of imperial units, for particular measurements, international use of imperial units is still followed.

 In licensed venues, draught beer and cider is sold in glasses and jugs with sizes based on the imperial fluid ounce, though rounded to the nearest 5 mL.
 Newborns are measured in metric at hospitals, but the birth weight and length is sometimes also announced to family and friends in imperial units.
 Screen sizes, are frequently advertised in inches instead of or as well as centimetres.
 Property size is frequently advertised in acres, but is mostly as square metres.
 Navigation is done in nautical miles, and water-based speed limits are in nautical miles per hour.
 Historical writing and presentations may include pre-metric units to reflect the context of the era represented.
 The illicit drug trade in Australia still often uses imperial measurements, particularly when dealing with smaller amounts closer to end user levels e.g.
 Firearm barrel length are almost always referred by in inches, ammunition is also still measured in grain and ounces as well as grams.

As a result of cultural transmission of British and American English in Australia, there has also been noted to be a cause for residual use of imperial units of measure.

New Zealand

New Zealand introduced the metric system on 15 December 1976. Aviation was exempt, with altitude and airport elevation continuing to be measured in feet whilst navigation is done in nautical miles; all other aspects (fuel quantity, aircraft weight, runway length, etc.) use metric units.

Screen sizes for devices such as televisions, monitors and phones, and wheel rim sizes for vehicles, are stated in inches, as is the convention in the rest of the world - and a 1992 study found a continued use of imperial units for birth weight and human height alongside metric units.

Ireland

Ireland has officially changed over to the metric system since entering the European Union, with distances on new road signs being metric since 1997 and speed limits being metric since 2005. The imperial system remains in limited use – for sales of beer in pubs (traditionally sold by the pint). All other goods are required by law to be sold in metric units with traditional quantities being retained for goods like butter and sausages, which are sold in  packaging. The majority of cars sold pre-2005 feature speedometers with miles per hour as the primary unit, but with a kilometres per hour display. Often signs such as those for bridge height can display both metric and imperial units. Imperial measurements continue to be used colloquially by the general population especially with height and distance measurements such as feet, inches, and acres as well as for weight with pounds and stones still in common use among people of all ages. Measurements such as yards have fallen out of favour with younger generations. Ireland's railways still use imperial measurements for distances and speed signage. Property is usually listed in square feet as well as metres also.

Horse racing in Ireland still continues to use stones, pounds, miles and furlongs as measurements.

Bahamas

Imperial measurements remain in general use in the Bahamas.

Legally, both the imperial and metric systems are recognised by the Weights and Measures Act 2006.

Other countries
Some imperial measurements remain in limited use in Malaysia, the Philippines, Sri Lanka and South Africa. Measurements in feet and inches, especially for a person's height, are frequently encountered in conversation and non-governmental publications.

Prior to metrication, it was a common practice in Malaysia for people to refer to unnamed locations and small settlements along major roads by referring to how many miles the said locations were from the nearest major town. In some cases, these eventually became the official names of the locations; in other cases, such names have been largely or completely superseded by new names. An example of the former is Batu 32 (literally "Mile 32" in Malay), which refers to the area surrounding the intersection between Federal Route 22 (the Tamparuli-Sandakan highway) and Federal Route 13 (the Sandakan-Tawau highway). The area is so named because it is 32 miles west of Sandakan, the nearest major town.

Petrol is still sold by the imperial gallon in Anguilla, Antigua and Barbuda, Belize, Myanmar, the Cayman Islands, Dominica, Grenada, Montserrat, St Kitts and Nevis and St. Vincent and the Grenadines. The United Arab Emirates Cabinet in 2009 issued the Decree No. (270 / 3) specifying that, from 1 January 2010, the new unit sale price for petrol will be the litre and not the gallon, which was in line with the UAE Cabinet Decision No. 31 of 2006 on the national system of measurement, which mandates the use of International System of units as a basis for the legal units of measurement in the country. Sierra Leone switched to selling fuel by the litre in May 2011.

In October 2011, the Antigua and Barbuda government announced the re-launch of the Metrication Programme in accordance with the Metrology Act 2007, which established the International System of Units as the legal system of units. The Antigua and Barbuda government has committed to a full conversion from the imperial system by the first quarter of 2015.

See also

Explanatory notes

Citations

General sources 
 Appendices B and C of NIST Handbook 44
  Also available as a PDF file.
 6 George IV chapter 12, 1825 (statute)

External links 

 British Weights And Measures Association
 Canada Weights and Measures Act 1970-71-72
 General table of units of measure – NIST – pdf
 How Many? A Dictionary of Units of Measurement 
 

Imperial units
Customary units of measurement
Systems of units
1824 introductions